State Route 314 (SR 314) is a north–south state highway in the northern portion of the U.S. state of Ohio. The southern terminus of SR 314 is at a T-intersection with the duplex of U.S. Route 36 (US 36) and SR 3 in Centerburg.

Route description
SR 314 travels through southwestern Knox County, eastern Morrow County and western Richland County.  There are no stretches of this highway that are incorporated within the National Highway System, a network of routes identified as being most important for the economy, mobility and defense of the country.

History
The SR 314 designation made its debut in 1932.  It was originally routed entirely within Morrow County, along its present alignment between the SR 95 junction in Chesterville and the US 42 intersection southwest of Lexington.

In 1935, SR 314 was extended on the south end.  It was routed along previously un-numbered roadways to a new endpoint at its present southern terminus at the US 36/SR 3 duplex in Centerburg.  Then, in 1939, SR 314 was lengthened on the north end when it was extended along roads that were previously locally-maintained to its current northern terminus at SR 61 south of Shelby.

Major intersections

See also

References

External links

314
Transportation in Knox County, Ohio
Transportation in Morrow County, Ohio
Transportation in Richland County, Ohio